On Top is the third studio album recorded by the Four Tops, issued by Motown Records in July 1966. It reached number 32 on the US Billboard Top LPs chart and number 9 in the UK. It contains two singles: "Loving You Is Sweeter Than Ever" and "Shake Me, Wake Me (When It's Over)". The second half of the album consists of cover songs.

Track listing

Personnel

Performance
Renaldo Benson – vocals
Abdul Fakir – vocals
Lawrence Payton – keyboards, vocals
Levi Stubbs – vocals
The Andantes - vocals
The Funk Brothers - instrumentation
Stevie Wonder - drums on "Loving You is Sweeter than Ever"

References

External links
On Top at MTV, with lyrics

Four Tops albums
1966 albums
Albums produced by Brian Holland
Albums produced by Edward Holland Jr.
Albums produced by Lamont Dozier
Albums produced by Smokey Robinson
Albums recorded at Hitsville U.S.A.
Motown albums